Atofio Hrisafi (Greek: Ατόφιο Χρυσάφι; English: Pure gold) is the sixth studio album by Greek artist, Katy Garbi. It was released on 23 September 1994 by Sony Music Greece and received platinum certification in Greece, selling over 100,000 units*. The album was written by Kostas Tournas and Phoebus (five songs each), containing many of her most successful songs like "Xipoliti Horevo", "Mi Me Sigkrineis", "Kolasi" and "Atofio Hrisafi".

In 1994, platinum was the album whose sales exceeded 60,000 units.

Track listing

Singles and music videos 
The following singles were officially released to radio stations with music videos and gained a lot of airplay.

"Xipoliti Horevo" (Ξυπόλυτη Χορεύω; I Dance Barefoot)(Director: Nikos Soulis)
"Atofio Hrisafi" (Ατόφιο Χρυσάφι; Pure Gold)(Director: Giorgos Sofoulis)
"Mi Me Sigkrineis" (Μη Με Συγκρίνεις; Don't Compare Me)(Director:)
"Kolasi" (Κόλαση; Hell)(Director:)
"Se Poliorkia (Pes, Pes)" (Σε Πολιορκία (Πες, Πες));In Siege (Say It, Say It))(Director: Giorgos Louizos)

Credits 
Credits adapted from liner notes.

Personnel
Charis Andreadis – orchestration (tracks: 6, 7, 8, 9, 10)
Giannis Bithikotsis – bouzouki, baglama (tracks: 9)
Charis Chalkitis – backing vocals (tracks: 6, 8)
Antonis Gounaris – guitars (tracks: 6, 7, 8, 9, 10) / cümbüş (tracks: 6, 7, 10) / second vocal (tracks: 7, 9)
Giotis Kiourtsoglou – bass (tracks: 2, 3, 4)
Stavros Lantsias – orchestration, programming, keyboards (tracks: 1, 2, 3, 4, 5) / guitars (tracks: 1, 4)
Nikos Logothetis – backing vocals (tracks: 6, 8)
Sofia Noiti – backing vocals (tracks: 6, 8)
Giorgos Notaras – percussion (tracks: 1)
Thodoris Pasiaras – bouzouki (tracks: 1, 4)
Pimis Petrou – backing vocals (tracks: 2, 3, 5)
Orestis Plakidis – programming, keyboards (tracks: 6, 7, 8, 9, 10)
Sandy Politi – backing vocals (tracks: 2, 3, 5)
Giorgos Roilos – percussion (tracks: 7, 8)
Silvios Siros – saxophone (tracks: 5)
Akis Tourkogiorgis – guitars (tracks: 2, 3, 4)
Dimitris Tsopanellis – backing vocals (tracks: 2, 3, 5)
Martha Zioga – backing vocals (tracks: 2, 3, 5)

Production
Achilleas Charitos – make up
Ntinos Diamantopoulos – photographer
Giannis Doxas – art direction
Giannis Doulamis – production manager
Giannis Ioannidis (Digital Press Hellas) – mastering
Dimitris Malegkas (City studio) – sound engineer, mix engineer (tracks: 1, 2, 3, 4, 5)
Giannis Michailidis – hair styling
Panagiotis Petronikolos (Sierra studio) – sound engineer, mix engineer (tracks: 6, 7, 8, 9, 10)
Giannis Tountas (City studio) – sound engineer, mix engineer (tracks: 1, 2, 3, 4, 5)

Accolades 
Atofio Hrisafi was gained two awards at the Pop Corn Music Awards 1995:

 Best Album of the Year
 Best Folk Dance Track (Xipoliti Horevo)

References 

1994 albums
Katy Garbi albums
Albums produced by Phoebus (songwriter)
Greek-language albums
Sony Music Greece albums